(plural ) is a German term used in musical notation to denote a barline that is drawn between staves, but not across them. It is typically seen in modern editions of Medieval and Renaissance vocal polyphony, where it is intended to allow modern performers the convenience of barlines without having them interfere with the music, which was originally written without barlines. In most cases note values are allowed to cross over a  without requiring a tie.

It is frequently applied in academic editions of 15th and 16th century music such as those in the multi-volume Corpus mensurabilis musicae published by the American Institute of Musicology.

A few modern composers (such as Hugo Distler, whose vocal music is reminiscent of Renaissance vocal polyphony) have made a practice of using it in their music in order to minimize the regularity of meter.

References

Musical notation
German words and phrases